The first northern Estonian language version of the New Testament was published in 1715, with the whole Bible of Anton thor Helle appearing in Estonian in 1739.

References

Estonian
Estonian language